ETV may stand for:

Television
 Educational television, the use of television in education
 Enhanced TV, an interactive television application specification

Africa
 e.tv, South Africa
 ETV (Ethiopia), Ethiopian Broadcasting Corporation
 ETV Ghana

Asia
 Ekushey Television, a Bangladeshi television channel
 Educational Television (Hong Kong), a programming block
 India
 ETV Andhra Pradesh
 ETV Bal Bharat, Hyderabad
 ETV Bangla, now Colors Bangla
 ETV Bihar, now News18 Bihar-Jharkhand
 ETV Gujarati, now Colors Gujarati
 ETV Hindi, now News18 Uttar Pradesh Uttarakhand
 ETV Marathi, now Colors Marathi
 ETV Network, a satellite television network
 ETV News Kannada, now News18 Kannada
 ETV News Odia, now News18 Odia
 ETV (Telugu)
 ETV Urdu, now News18 Urdu
 NHK Educational TV, Japan
 ETV (Malaysian IPTV service), defunct
 ETV (Mongolia)
 ETV (Sri Lanka), a terrestrial television network

Europe
 Eesti Televisioon, the Estonian national public television station
 ETV (Greece), now Epsilon TV, a regional television channel

North America
 Mississippi Educational Television, a public broadcasting network in the United States
 South Carolina Educational Television, a public broadcasting network in the United States

Other
 Electric track vehicle, a motorized vehicle in a rail-based conveyor system
 Emergency tow vessel, a type of large tug boat used in ocean rescue
 Electro-Thermal Vaporisation, a inductively coupled plasma mass spectrometry technique
 Endoscopic third ventriculostomy, a treatment for hydrocephalus
 Entecavir, an oral antiviral drug used in the treatment of hepatitis B
 Environmental Technology Verification Program of the US Environmental Protection Agency
 e-Tourist Visa, a subcategory of e-Visa for tourists to India